Ulrike Klees (born 3 May 1955) is a retired German swimmer. She competed in the 200 m breaststroke event at the 1972 Summer Olympics, but failed to reach the final.

She has a degree in psychology, and after retiring from swimming worked as a sport psychologist with the national swimming team and top athletes from other disciplines. Since 1990 she works with musicians and is a lecturer at the Bavarian State Opera.

References

1955 births
Living people
German female swimmers
German female breaststroke swimmers
Swimmers at the 1972 Summer Olympics
Olympic swimmers of West Germany
Sportspeople from Gelsenkirchen
20th-century German women
21st-century German women